Acanthochaenus luetkenii, the pricklefish, is a species of pricklefish found in the oceans at depths of from .  This species grows to a length of  SL.  This species is the only known member of its genus.

References
 

Stephanoberycidae
Fish described in 1884